Dease Lake  is a small community in the Cassiar Country of the Northern Interior of British Columbia, Canada. It is 230 km south of the Yukon border on Stewart–Cassiar Highway (Highway 37) at the south end of the lake of the same name.  Dease Lake is the last major centre before the Alaska Highway while driving northbound, and also the junction to Telegraph Creek and the Grand Canyon of the Stikine. Dease Lake Indian Reserve No. 9 is nearby and is under the governance of the Tahltan First Nation band government.

The town sits astride a drainage divide separating the basins of the Dease River (to the north) from that of the Tanzilla (to the south), a tributary of the Stikine. As this is a division point between drainage to the Pacific Ocean, via the Stikine, and the Arctic Ocean, via the Liard and Mackenzie Rivers, this is part of the Continental Divide.

The town has a school, various stores, a fuel and service station, hotel, and a Northern Lights College campus. It used to have a restaurant and a pub, but both have closed. The town sees a large influx of visitors during the summer months from tourists on their way to the Alaska Highway, Yukon, and Alaska. A majority of these tourists are from Canada or the United States.  Dease Lake is also a destination for hunting and other wilderness activities, and the local economy benefits from local gold, copper, and jade mining and exploration activities.

History
The Lake had been named in 1834 for Chief Factor Peter Warren Dease, and would become a major junction for miners travelling to the gold rush in Cassiar (later an asbestos mine). Although the fort was abandoned soon after, the town based around the fort lived on, and was renamed Dease Lake in 1934 by then-Chief Trader John McLeod.

During the 1960s and 1970s, BC Rail started to build an extension of their line towards Dease Lake, but construction was halted.

Geography
North of Dease Lake is Good Hope Lake and the Alaska Highway. South of Dease Lake is Iskut, Stewart, and Kitwanga.

Climate
Dease Lake has a subarctic climate (Köppen Dfc), typical of northern British Columbia. Summers are mild, coupled with chilly nights while winters are severely cold and snowy, with annual snowfall averaging . Autumn typically begins by early September and lasts into October when winter begins. Winter can last into late March or sometimes early April. Spring usually lasts until late May or early June, after when summer begins. Due to Dease Lake's high elevation, snowfall is possible during any month of the year.

References

External links

Dease Lake Website
Dease Lake Community Website 
School District 87 (Stikine)

Unincorporated settlements in British Columbia
Stikine Country
Cassiar Country
Populated places in the Regional District of Kitimat–Stikine
Designated places in British Columbia
Great Divide of North America
Hudson's Bay Company trading posts